Philenora elegans is a moth of the subfamily Arctiinae first described by Arthur Gardiner Butler in 1877. It is found in Australia.

References

Lithosiini